Jack Renner (born July 6, 1956) is an American professional golfer who played on the PGA Tour from 1977–1988, and  on the Champions Tour from 2006–2007.

Renner was born in Palm Springs, California. While in high school at the age of 17, he won the  U.S. Junior Amateur. He attended the College of the Desert in Palm Desert, California. He turned pro in 1976 and joined the PGA Tour in 1977.

Renner had three PGA Tour event wins during that phase of his career. His first win was at the 1979 Manufacturers Hanover Westchester Classic. In 1981 he earned his second Tour victory at the Pleasant Valley Jimmy Fund Classic. His last win came at the 1984 Hawaiian Open. He had 53 top-10 finishes including over a dozen 2nd or 3rd-place finishes in his PGA Tour career. His best finish in a major was T9 at the 1985 U.S. Open.

After his PGA Tour days were over, Renner played some on the Nationwide Tour. His best finish in that venue is a T-22 at the 1993 NIKE Utah Classic. He turned 50 in July 2006 and made his debut on the Champions Tour at the U.S. Senior Open.

Renner was known for his outstanding short game. He has a sister (Jane) who played on the LPGA Tour and a brother (Jim). All three siblings won Junior World Golf Championships in their youth. He lives in San Diego, California.

Amateur wins
1968 Junior World Golf Championships (Boys 11-12)
1972 Junior World Golf Championships (Boys 15-17)
1973 U.S. Junior Amateur

Professional wins (4)

PGA Tour wins (3)

PGA Tour playoff record (1–0)

Other wins (1)
1980 Cacharel World Under-25 Championship

Results in major championships

Note: Renner never played in The Open Championship.

WD = withdrew
CUT = missed the half-way cut
"T" = tied

See also 

 Spring 1977 PGA Tour Qualifying School graduates

References

External links

American male golfers
PGA Tour golfers
PGA Tour Champions golfers
Golfers from San Diego
Sportspeople from Palm Springs, California
1956 births
Living people